The 2010 King Cup of Champions, or The Custodian of the Two Holy Mosques Cup, was the 35th season of King Cup of Champions since its establishment in 1957, and the 3rd under the current edition. Al-Shabab were the defending champion but they were eliminated by Al-Ittihad in semi-finals.

Al-Ittihad won  their first title in the current edition and seventh overall after beating Al-Hilal 5–4 on penalties in the final.

Participating teams

* Number of appearance in King Cup of Champions since the 2008 season.

Fixtures and results

Bracket

Quarter-finals
Quarter-finals were played on 4, 5, 8 & 9 April 2010.

|}

First Leg

Second Leg

Semi-finals
Semi-finals were played on 20–21 April and 2–3 May 2010.

|}

First Leg

Second Leg

Third Place
Third place game was played on 6 May 2010.

Final

Winner

References

2010
2009–10 in Saudi Arabian football
2009–10 domestic association football cups